Thambi may refer to:

 Thambi (2006 film)
 Thambi (2019 film)